St Peters, Dunboyne is a Gaelic Athletic Association club based in the town of Dunboyne, in County Meath, Ireland. The club competes at senior level in football, hurling, Camogie and ladies football in Meath GAA competitions. The club was founded in 1902 by primary school teacher, Bob O'Keefe. The club originally only played hurling but started to play organized games of Gaelic football in the late 1940s.
Currently, the club has over 1200 members, including 700 players across 60 teams.

Achievements
 Meath Senior Hurling Championship Winners 1908, 1911, 1912, 1913, 1914
 Meath Senior Football Championship Winners 1998, 2005 2018
 Meath Intermediate Football Championship: 1952, 1992
 Meath Intermediate Hurling Championship: 1962, 1980, 1986, 1989, 1999
 Meath Junior Football Championship: 1962, 1989
 Meath Junior Hurling Championship Winners 1935, 1963, 2004, 2006
 U-14 Féile Winners - 2009, 2003

Notable players
 Donal Lenihan, current member of Meath senior football team
 Brian Smyth, All-Ireland winning captain
 Andy McEntee, All-Ireland winner with Meath senior football team, current Meath senior football manager
 Shane McEntee
 Enda McManus, All-Ireland winner with Meath senior football team
 David Gallagher, All-Ireland winner with Meath senior football team
 Brendan Reilly, All-Ireland winner with Meath senior football team
 Seán Boylan, manager of Meath senior football team, four-time All-Ireland winner

References

External links
History
Roll of Honour

Gaelic games clubs in County Meath